The 2011–12 NCAA football bowl games were a series of college football bowl games.  They concluded the 2011 NCAA Division I FBS football season, and included 35 team-competitive games and five all-star games.  The games began on December 17, 2011 and, aside from the all-star games, concluded with the 2012 BCS National Championship Game in New Orleans, that was played on January 9, 2012.

The total of 35 team-competitive bowls was unchanged from the previous year. While bowl games had been the purview of only the very best teams for nearly a century, this was the sixth consecutive year that teams with non-winning seasons participated in bowl games. To fill the 70 available team-competitive bowl slots, a total of 14 teams (20% of all participants) with non-winning seasons participated in bowl games—13 had a .500 (6-6) season and, for the first time ever, a team with a sub-.500 (6-7) season was invited to a bowl game.

Selection of the teams

In the previous year's bowl cycle, the NCAA scrapped a bylaw which mandated that a school with a non-losing record of 6–6 in regular season play were not eligible unless conferences could not fill out available bowl positions with teams with a winning record of seven (or more) wins. The new rule was stretched further in this 2011-12 bowl season when a team with a losing record, the 6–7 UCLA Bruins, were invited to a bowl game. The Bruins, the Pac-12 South Division winners, finished 6–6 but the USC Trojans (10–2), winners of the division, were barred from postseason play because of the University of Southern California athletics scandal of the mid-2000s, and the resulting two-year ban.  The conference and the school applied for a waiver, which the NCAA accepted, based on their bowl eligibility after the sixth win, but having to play in an unmerited conference championship game.

This interpretation of policy ultimately led to Western Kentucky, with a 7–5 winning record, or Ball State, with a 6–6 non-losing record, going uninvited.

Bowl eligibility

Eligible
 ACC (8):  Clemson (ACC Champions), Georgia Tech, Virginia Tech (Coastal Division Champions), North Carolina, Florida State, Virginia, Wake Forest, NC State 
 Big East (5): Cincinnati (Big East co-champions), West Virginia (Big East co-champions), Rutgers, Louisville (Big East co-champions), Pittsburgh
 Big Ten (10):  Illinois, Michigan, Iowa, Penn State, Wisconsin (Big Ten Champions), Nebraska, Michigan State (Legends Division Champions), Ohio State, Northwestern, Purdue
 Big 12 (8): Oklahoma State (Big 12 Champions), Kansas State, Oklahoma, Texas, Baylor, Iowa State, Texas A&M, Missouri
 Conference USA (5):  Houston (C-USA West Division Champions), Southern Miss (C-USA Champions), Tulsa, SMU, Marshall
 Independents (2): BYU, Notre Dame
 MAC (6): NIU (Mid-American Conference Champions), Ohio (MAC East Division Champions), Ball State, Toledo (MAC West Division Co-Champions), Temple, Western Michigan
 Mountain West (5):  Air Force, Boise State, TCU (Mountain West Champions), San Diego State, Wyoming
 Pac-12 (7):  Stanford (Pac-12 North Division Co-Champions), Oregon (Pac-12 Champions), Arizona State, Washington, California, Utah, UCLA (Pac-12 South Division Champions, 6–7, bowl-eligible per waiver)  
 SEC (9):  LSU (SEC Champions), Alabama, South Carolina, Arkansas, Georgia (SEC East Division Champions), Auburn, Florida, Vanderbilt, Mississippi State
 Sun Belt (4):  Louisiana–Lafayette, Arkansas State (Sun Belt Champions), Florida International, Western Kentucky
 WAC (3): Louisiana Tech (WAC Champions), Nevada, Utah State

Number of bowl berths available: 70
Number of teams assured of bowl eligibility: 71 (72, with 6–7 UCLA becoming bowl-eligible per NCAA waiver)

Western Kentucky (7–5) and Ball State (6–6) were not extended invitations to bowl games.

Teams unable to become bowl-eligible
 ACC (4): Boston College, Maryland & Duke (by record), Miami (FL) (via self-imposed sanctions)
 Big East (3): South Florida, Syracuse, Connecticut
 Big Ten (2): Indiana, Minnesota
 Big 12 (2): Kansas, Texas Tech
 C-USA (7): UAB, Memphis, Tulane, Rice, UCF, UTEP, East Carolina
 Independents (2): Army & Navy
 MAC (7): Akron, Buffalo, Central Michigan, Bowling Green, Miami (OH) & Kent State. Eastern Michigan was 6–6 but had two FCS wins. 
 Mountain West (3):  New Mexico, UNLV & Colorado State
 Pac-12 (5):  Colorado, Oregon State, Washington State & Arizona (by record), USC (via NCAA sanctions)
 SEC (3): Ole Miss, Kentucky & Tennessee
 Sun Belt (5):  Florida Atlantic, Louisiana-Monroe, Middle Tennessee, Troy & North Texas
 WAC (5): Idaho, San Jose State,  Fresno State, Hawaii & New Mexico State

Fiesta Bowl controversy

In March 2011, because of illegal campaign contributions to politicians friendly to the Fiesta Bowl, the Fiesta Bowl Board of Directors fired bowl CEO John Junker.  The scandal threatened the Fiesta Bowl's status as a BCS game for the 2011-12 season, as the BCS said it might replace the bowl in its lineup if officials could not convince them it should remain.  In May 2011, the BCS fined the Fiesta Bowl organization US $1 million without removing their BCS spot.

New bowl sponsors
Meineke has transferred their sponsorship from the game in Charlotte to the Houston-based game previously known as the Texas Bowl, and was renamed the Meineke Car Care Bowl of Texas.  Belk Department Stores assumes the title sponsorship for the North Carolina contest, renaming that game the Belk Bowl. The Idaho Potato Commission takes over as the title sponsor for the Humanitarian Bowl in Boise, Idaho and has been renamed the Famous Idaho Potato Bowl, while Montreal-based Gildan, a maker of T-shirts, underwear and socks, will begin sponsorship of the previously unsponsored New Mexico Bowl this season. All of the bowl games will have a presenting or title sponsor.

Moratorium on new bowl games
The NCAA has placed a three-year moratorium, starting with the 2011-12 bowl season, on any new bowl games.  This follows the addition of two new games (Pinstripe Bowl, TicketCity Bowl) for the 2010-11 bowl season, bringing the total number of bowl games to 35.  The expansion to 70 teams required to fill these 35 bowl games has challenged the ability to actually find enough teams with winning (7-5 or better) records to fill bowl slots.  Teams with non-winning (6-6) and losing (6-7) records have participated in bowl games since the expansion to 35 games.  By the 2012-13 bowl season, with multiple teams ineligible due to sanctions, the NCAA was forced to anticipate a need to allow teams with even worse (5-7) losing records to fill bowl selection slots in 2012-13.

Schedule
The official schedule was released June 17, 2011.  Though it is traditionally the date for many bowl games to be played, none will be held on January 1, due to that date being on a Sunday and conflict with the National Football League's slate of Sunday games.

Subsequently, the Fiesta Bowl moved from January 5 to January 2, in its traditional spot following the Rose Bowl, after the 2011 NFL lockout was settled. The Monday evening spot was held open for a possible Monday Night Football game.

NOTE: All times are US EST (UTC −5).

Non-BCS games

2012 Bowl Championship Series schedule

Post-BCS all-star games

Note: The NFLPA Texas vs The Nation game was not played in 2012, and the NFLPA instead sponsored the NFLPA Collegiate Bowl.

References

Further reading